The Maxus D60 is a mid-size SUV produced by Chinese automaker SAIC under the sub-brand Maxus since  2019.

Overview

Previewed by the Maxus Tarantula Concept revealed during the 2018 Beijing Auto Show, the Maxus D60 debuted on February 28, 2019, and was first shown to the general public during the 2019 Shanghai Auto Show. The D60 is available in 5-seater and 7-seater models with 2+3, 2+2+2, and 2+3+2 seating configurations.

Specifications
The Maxus D60 is capable of Level 2.5 semi-autonomous driving including cruise control and driverless parking systems equipped. Transmission options include a 6-speed manual transmission and 7-speed DCT.

Maxus D60e (Maxus Euniq 6)

A plug-in hybrid version of the Maxus D60 called the Maxus D60e and later Maxus Euniq 6 was also revealed during the 2019 Shanghai Auto Show. The exterior styling is largely the same as the petrol-powered version while subtle blue accents were added in the headlamps, grilles, and intakes.

Specifications

References

External links

Maxus official website

D90
Cars introduced in 2019
Rear-wheel-drive vehicles
All-wheel-drive vehicles
Crossover sport utility vehicles
Plug-in hybrid vehicles
Cars of China
Compact sport utility vehicles